Sir Colin Ian Birss (born December 1964 in Thurso) is a judge of the Court of Appeal of England and Wales.

Career
Birss attended Largs Academy and then Lancaster Royal Grammar School. He graduated from Downing College, Cambridge in 1986 with a first class honours degree in metallurgy and materials sciences. Birss worked for Arthur Andersen until 1988 and after legal training at City University London he was called to the bar at Middle Temple in 1990, joining Three New Square, a specialist intellectual property set of barristers' chambers.

Birss was made a Queen's Counsel in 2008. He was appointed a Specialist Circuit Judge on 5 October 2010 and assigned to the Patents County Court in 2010 and authorised to sit as a deputy High Court judge. On 13 May 2013, he was appointed a High Court judge, assigned to the Chancery Division, and received the customary knighthood in the 2013 Special Honours. He was appointed a Lord Justice of Appeal on 8 February 2021.

Cases
In 2011 he sat on the controversial case brought by ACS Law on behalf of MediaCAT, relating to file downloading on peer-to-peer filesharing networks.

In 2012 he ruled on Temple Island v New English Teas, a case where a photograph of an AEC Routemaster London bus crossing Westminster Bridge was found sufficiently similar to another photograph of the subject to constitute copyright infringement.

In July 2012, Birss, sitting in the High Court, ruled that Samsung did not infringe Apple's registered design right in its iPad tablet. The judgment mirrored the decision made earlier in the US by a jury. In October 2012 the Court of Appeal upheld the judgment, including the publicity order imposed on Apple because it was necessary to clear up uncertainty in the market place after Apple took legal action in Germany against Samsung. The order required Apple to publicise that it had lost the case on its website and in the media. The Court of Appeal said:

Personal life
Birss lives with his wife and their three children at their family home in Hertfordshire. His recreations include beekeeping.

References

1964 births
Living people
Alumni of Downing College, Cambridge
21st-century English judges
Chancery Division judges
Knights Bachelor
People educated at Largs Academy
People from Thurso
Anglo-Scots